Saint Lawrence Academy was a college-preparatory Roman Catholic high school in Santa Clara, California, United States, founded in 1975. The school was marketed for its small size with close interaction among students, administration, faculty, and counselors. It was affiliated with the Diocese of San Jose. It closed in 2016.

Academics 
As a college preparatory school, Saint Lawrence Academy's graduation requirements included coursework in English, mathematics, social studies, science, foreign language, fine arts, religious studies, computers and physical education. The school also offered Advanced Placement and various honors courses. Languages included French, Spanish, and American Sign Language.

Athletics 
Approximately 70% of Saint Lawrence Academy students participated in athletics. The Celtics fielded 14 teams in 11 sports, including  basketball, baseball, cross country, golf, soccer, swimming, tennis, track and field, and volleyball.

Saint Lawrence Academy's Cross Country team began in 1988 and competed in the Private School Athletic League (PSAL).  The school earned 10 individual qualifications to the Division 5 CIF State Cross Country Championships. Celtics runners competed in State Championship races nine times since 2000.  Three former athletes finished runner-up in the Division 5 Central Coast Section (CCS): Omar Ahmad, 2nd place, 2001 and 2002; Amina Ahmad, 2nd place, 2004 (3rd place in 2003); and Carlos Chavez, 2nd place, 2007. Omar Ahmad competed in cross country and track and field for Santa Clara University.

In 2010, the cross country team went undefeated during the regular league season and were co-league champions of the PSAL, representing the best overall team effort on the largest team in school history (33 athletes). The 2010 team also broke numerous school records, including overall team size, earning a perfect score in a league meet (JV league finals with a score of 15), two first place race finishers in two league meet races in the same meet (varsity and JV boys individual champions) and many more.  One very important school record was established by the girls—having five girls stay together all season to finish with the first ever girls team in school history.

Saint Lawrence Academy Track and Field also began in 1998, and competed as a supplemental member of the West Bay Athletic League (WBAL).  The Celtics earned a total of 11 CCS trials qualifications. Celtics athletes have competed in the CCS trials in 2001, 2003, 2005, 2006, 2007, 2008, 2009, 2010, and qualified two athletes at the end of the 2011 season.  The 2011 track & field team had a roster of 58 athletes and 4 student managers, representing 25% of the student body. One former student is the 11th best pole vaulter in CCS history and later member of the Cornell University Big Red track & field team, Josh Cusick.  During his time at St. Lawrence, Cusick earned All-American status twice: in the decathlon at the 2007 USATF National Junior Olympic Championships in Walnut, California, and in the pentathlon at the 2008 National Scholastic Indoor Championships in New York City.  During his junior year, Cusick finished 6th in the state of California at the State Championships in the pole vault.  During his senior year he jumped a school record of 16–00.75 and became the 11th best all-time pole vaulter in the CCS. He finished his high school career with a total of 16 school records (400m, 800m, 1000m, 60m/65m/110m/300m/400m hurdles, long jump, high jump, discus, pole vault, 4 × 400m relay, javelin, pentathlon, and decathlon). In February and May 2011, as a sophomore at Cornell, he became the Ivy League's reigning men's heptathlon runner-up and men's decathlon runner-up at the indoor and outdoor Heptagonal Championships, respectively.

Saint Lawrence Academy's Baseball team has also been invited, perennially, to the CIF-CCS championships. The soccer team from the 1995–96 school year made the CCS playoffs for the first time in school history.

History 
In , Saint Lawrence Academy was founded.

Closure 
On , the Diocese of San Jose announced the closure of Saint Lawrence Academy at the conclusion of the school year due to "a significant accumulated deficit, declining enrollment levels, and the inability to raise funds to stabilize and sustain operations".

References

External links 

Educational institutions established in 1975
Educational institutions disestablished in 2016
Roman Catholic Diocese of San Jose in California
Catholic secondary schools in California
Education in Santa Clara, California
High schools in Santa Clara County, California